The wet sulfuric acid process (WSA process) is a gas desulfurization process. After Danish company Haldor Topsoe introduced this technology in 1987, it has been recognized as a process for recovering sulfur from various process gases in the form of commercial quality sulfuric acid (H2SO4) with the simultaneous production of high-pressure steam. The WSA process can be applied in all industries where sulfur removal presents an issue.

The wet catalysis process is used for processing sulfur-containing streams, such as:
H2S gas from e.g. amine gas treating unit
Off-gas from sour water stripper (SWS) gas
Off-gas from Rectisol
Spent acid from an alkylation unit
Claus process tail gas
Heavy residue or petcoke-fired utility boiler off-gas
Boiler flue gases from various processes SNOX flue gas desulfurization
Metallurgical process gas
Production of sulfuric acid

The process 

The main reactions in the WSA process
Combustion: 	2 H2S + 3 O2  2 H2O + 2 SO2  (-1036 kJ/mol)
Oxidation: 	2 SO2 + O2  2 SO3  (-198 kJ/mol) [in the presence of a vanadium (V) oxide catalyst]
Hydration: 	SO3 + H2O  H2SO4 (g) (-101 kJ/mol)
Condensation: 	H2SO4 (g)  H2SO4 (l) (-90 kJ/mol)

The energy released by the above-mentioned reactions is used for steam production. Approximately 2–3 tons of high-pressure steam are produced per ton of acid.

Industrial applications
Industries where WSA process plants are installed:
	Refinery and petrochemical industry
	Metallurgy industry
	Coal-based industry (coking and gasification)
	Power industry
	Viscose industry
	Sulfuric acid industry

WSA for gasifiers
The acid gas coming from a Rectisol-, Selexol-, amine gas treating or similar unit installed after the gasifier contains H2S, COS and hydrocarbons in addition to CO2. These gases were previously vented to the atmosphere, but now the acid gas requires purification in order not to affect the environment with SO2 emission. The WSA process provides a high sulfur recovery and recovers heat for steam production. The heat recovery rate is high, and the cooling water consumption is low, which saves resources.

Examples of WSA process for gasification
Example 1:
Feed-gas flow: 14,000 Nm3/h
Composition [vol %]: 5.8% H2S, 1.2% COS, 9.7% HC and 77.4% CO2
SOx concentration [vol %]: 1.58%
H2SO4 production: 106 MTPD
Steam production: 53 ton/h
Cooling water consumption: 8 m3/ton acid (delta T = 10 °C)
Fuel consumption: 1,000 Nm3/h (LHV = 2,821 kcal/Nm3)

Example 2: 
A sulfur plant in China will be built in connection with an ammonia plant, producing 500 kilotons/year of ammonia for fertilizer production

Spent acid regeneration and production of sulfuric acid
The WSA process can also be used for the production of sulfuric acid from sulfur burning or regeneration of the spent acid from e.g., alkylation plants. Wet catalysis processes differ from other contact sulfuric acid processes in that the feed gas contains excess moisture when it comes into contact with the catalyst. The sulfur trioxide formed by catalytic oxidation of the sulfur dioxide reacts instantly with the moisture to produce sulfuric acid in the vapor phase to an extent determined by the temperature. Liquid acid is subsequently formed by condensation of the sulfuric acid vapor and not by the absorption of the sulfur trioxide in concentrated sulfuric acid, as in contact processes based on dry gases.

The concentration of the product acid depends on the H2O:SO3 ratio in the catalytically converted gases and on the condensation temperature.

The combustion gases are cooled to the converter inlet temperature of about 420–440 °C. Processing these wet gases in a conventional cold-gas contact process (DCDA) plant would necessitate cooling and drying of the gas to remove all moisture. Therefore, the WSA process is, in most cases, a more cost-efficient way of producing sulfuric acid.

About 80% to 85% of the world’s sulfur production is used to manufacture sulfuric acid. 50% of the world’s sulfuric acid production is used in fertilizer production, mainly to convert phosphates to water-soluble forms. according to the Fertilizer Manual published jointly by the United Nations Industrial Development Organization (UNIDO) and the International Fertilizer Development Center

References

Oil refining
Chemical processes
Air pollution control systems